Irakleio, Attica
 Irakleio, Thessaloniki
 A.E. Irakleio F.C
 Irakleio metro station

See also 

 Heraklion (disambiguation)
 Irakleia (disambiguation)